The Douglas NO-1 was a 1920s proposal for a reconnaissance aircraft by Douglas.

Design
The NO-1 was intended to use a pusher engine configuration and utilize one Curtiss V-1400 V-cylinder engine capable of delivering 500 horsepower.

References

1920s United States military reconnaissance aircraft
NO-2